The University of Veterinary Medicine Vienna (German: Veterinärmedizinische Universität Wien - in short: VUW) was founded in 1767 as the world's third school for veterinary medicine (after Lyon and Alfort) by Milan's Ludovico Scotti, originally named k. k. Pferde-Curen- und Operationsschule (literally, "Imperial-Royal School for the Cure and Surgery of Horses"). Today, it has c. 2,800 students and c. 600 employees.

Spin-offs

Since 2002, universities in Austria can found spin-off companies. Most of the spin-off companies are still located on the university's grounds: Animal Health IT, Biomodels Austria, Innovaphyt, Marinomed, Mycosafe, Novelix, VetWIDI, VirBiomed, ViruSure

The university also operates the Teaching and Research Farms outside of Vienna.

See also
 Schools of veterinary medicine

Notable alumni
 Herbert Haupt - Austrian politician

References

External links
 Official website

Universities and colleges in Vienna
1767 establishments in Austria
Veterinary schools in Austria